The Common Flash Memory Interface (CFI) is an open standard jointly developed by AMD, Intel, Sharp and Fujitsu. It is implementable by all flash memory vendors, and has been approved by the non-volatile-memory subcommittee of JEDEC. The goal of the specification is the interchangeability of flash memory devices offered by different vendors. The developer is able to use one driver for different flash products by reading identifying information from the flash chip.

Each flash memory device contains the following information: memory size, byte and word configuration, block configuration, and voltage and timing data.

The specification provides several benefits. No or very little information about flash devices has to be stored in tables within system software. It is possible to use lower cost flash memory devices as they become available without rewriting system software. Adapting current software systems shall be done more easily and quickly than previously.

Support for CFI is implemented in FreeBSD.

See also
Open NAND Flash Interface Specification (ONFi)

References

External links
JEDEC - free documents require registration
 JEDEC - Common Flash Interface (CFI) Specification, JESD68.01, September 2003.
  JEDEC - CFI ID Codes, JEP137B, May 2004
 JEDEC - Standard Manufacturers ID Code, JEP106AC, August 2010
Spansion
 Common Flash Interface Publication 100 (CFI Vendor & Device ID Code Assignments), 2001. (Original link)
   Spansion - App Note - CFI Spec, 2008. (Original link)
 Spansion - App Note - Using CFI to Read and Debug Systems, 2007. (Original link)
 Spansion - Quick Guide to Common Flash Interface, 2008.
AMD
 Common Flash Memory Interface Specification and Publication 100

Non-volatile memory
AMD technologies